Araopán-tepui is a tepui in Bolívar state, Venezuela. Together with the larger Aprada-tepui to the west, it forms part of the Aprada Massif. A steep, semi-circular ridge connects these two summits.

See also
 Distribution of Heliamphora

References

Tepuis of Venezuela
Mountains of Venezuela
Mountains of Bolívar (state)